Kivi (also Romanized as Kīvī; also known as Givi  ); and Küyü) is a city in the  Central District of Kowsar County, Ardabil province, Iran. At the 2006 census, its population was 6,467 in 1,721 households. The following census in 2011 counted 7,158 people in 1,974 households. The latest census in 2016 showed a population of 7,101 people in 2,182 households. Earlier, Kivi was divided into Upper and Lower Kivi: Kivi-ye Bala and Kivi-ye Pain.

References

External links
 Kivi Municipality

Kowsar County

Cities in Ardabil Province

Populated places in Ardabil Province

Populated places in Kowsar County